The Game of the Amazons (in Spanish, El Juego de las Amazonas; often called Amazons for short) is a two-player abstract strategy game invented in 1988 by Walter Zamkauskas of Argentina. The game is played by moving pieces and blocking the opponents from squares, and the last player able to move is the winner. It is a member of the territorial game family, a distant relative of Go and chess. 

The Game of the Amazons is played on a 10x10 chessboard (or an international checkerboard). Some players prefer to use a monochromatic board. The two players are White and Black; each player has four amazons (not to be confused with the amazon fairy chess piece), which start on the board in the configuration shown at right. A supply of markers (checkers, poker chips, etc.) is also required.

Rules 

White moves first, and the players alternate moves thereafter. Each move consists of two parts. First, one moves one of one's own amazons one or more empty squares in a straight line (orthogonally or diagonally), exactly as a queen moves in chess; it may not cross or enter a square occupied by an amazon of either color or an arrow. Second, after moving, the amazon shoots an arrow from its landing square to another square, using another queenlike move.  This arrow may travel in any orthogonal or diagonal direction (even backwards along the same path the amazon just traveled, into or across the starting square if desired). An arrow, like an amazon, cannot cross or enter a square where another arrow has landed or an amazon of either color stands.  The square where the arrow lands is marked to show that it can no longer be used.  The last player to be able to make a move wins.  Draws are impossible.

Territory and scoring 

The strategy of the game is based on using arrows (as well as one's four amazons) to block the movement of the opponent's amazons and gradually wall off territory, trying to trap the opponents in smaller regions and gain larger areas for oneself.  Each move reduces the available playing area, and eventually each amazon finds itself in a territory blocked off from all other amazons. The amazon can then move about its territory firing arrows until it no longer has any room to move. Since it would be tedious to actually play out all these moves, in practice the game usually ends when all of the amazons are in separate territories. The player with the largest amount of territory will be able to win, as the opponent will have to fill in her own territory more quickly.

Scores are sometimes used for tie-breaking purposes in Amazons tournaments. When scoring, it is important to note that although the number of moves remaining to a player is usually equal to the number of empty squares in the territories occupied by that player's amazons, it is nonetheless possible to have defective territories in which there are fewer moves left than there are empty squares.  The simplest such territory is three squares of the same colour, not in a straight line, with the amazon in the middle (for example, a1+b2+c1 with the amazon at b2).

History 

El Juego de las Amazonas was first published in Spanish in the Argentine puzzle magazine El Acertijo in December 1992.  An approved English translation written by Michael Keller appeared in the magazine World Game Review in January 1994. Other game publications also published the rules, and the game gathered a small but devoted following. The Internet spread the game more widely.

Michael Keller wrote the first known computer version of the game in VAX Fortran in 1994, and an updated version with graphics in Visual Basic in 1995. There are Amazons tournaments at the Computer Olympiad, a series of computer-versus-computer competitions.

El Juego de las Amazonas (The Game of the Amazons) is a trademark of Ediciones de Mente.

Computational complexity 

Usually, in the endgame, the board is partitioned into separate "royal chambers", with queens inside each chamber. We define simple Amazons endgames to be endgames where each chamber has at most one queen. 
Determining who wins in a simple Amazons endgame is NP-hard. This is proven by reducing it to finding the Hamiltonian path of a cubic subgraph of the square grid graph.

Generalized Amazons (that is, determining the winner of a game of Amazons played on a n x n grid, started from an arbitrary configuration) is PSPACE-complete. This can be proved in two ways.

 The first way is by reducing a generalized Hex position, which is known to be PSPACE-complete, into an Amazons position. 

 The second way is by reducing a certain kind of generalized geography called GEOGRAPHY-BP3, which is PSPACE-complete, to an Amazons position. This Amazons position uses only one black queen and one white queen, thus showing that generalized Amazons is PSPACE-complete even if only one queen on each side is allowed.

See also
Joust

References

Further reading 
.
.

Board games introduced in 1988
Abstract strategy games
PSPACE-complete problems